Omega Chi Epsilon (or , sometimes simplified to OXE) is an American honor society for chemical engineering students.

History 
The first chapter of Omega Chi Epsilon was formed at the University of Illinois in 1931 by a group of chemical engineering students. These Founders were:
 F. C. Howard
 A. Garrell Deem
 Ethan M. Stifle
 John W. Bertetti 

They were aided in their efforts by professors D.B. Keyes and Norman Krase.  The second chapter was formed at the Iowa State University in 1932.

The Society grew slowly at first. Baird's Manual indicates there were six chapters by 1957, of which three were inactive. However interest was revived in the 1960 which allowed a period of sustained growth that has continued to the present day.  There are approximately 80 active chapters of the society as of 2021.

Omega Chi Epsilon amended its constitution to permit women to become members as of 1966.

The organization became a member of the Association of College Honor Societies in 1967.

Membership is limited to chemical engineering juniors, seniors and graduate students. Associate membership may be offered to professors or other members of the staff of institutions within the field.

Governance 
The Society's annual meeting is held at the same time and place as the annual meeting of the American Institute of Chemical Engineers.

Governance is vested in a national president, vice-president, executive secretary and treasurer. With the immediate past president, these constitute the Executive Committee.

National officers 
 President - Dr. Christi Patton-Luks, Missouri Science and Technology
 Vice-president - Dr. Troy Vogel, University of Notre Dame
 Treasurer - Dr. G. Glenn Lipscomb, University of Toledo
 Executive Secretary - Dr. Richard A. Davis, University of Minnesota at Duluth

Symbolism and traditions 
The Society's badge is a black Maltese cross background, on which is superimposed a circular crest.  The crest bears the letters ΩΧΕ on a white band passing across the horizontal midline. Above the white band are two crossed retorts rendered in gold on a maroon background. Below the white band are a gold integral sign and a bolt of lightning. These symbols are noted to represent the roles of chemistry, mathematics and physics in chemical engineering.

The Society's official seal is made of two concentric circles, bearing at the top, center the words Omega Chi Epsilon with the words Founded, 1931 at the bottom center. The letters of the society appear in the center of the seal.

The Society's colors are black, white and maroon.

Chapter traditions of service to their chemical engineering departments commonly prevail rather than broader, national traditions.

See also
 American Institute of Chemical Engineers

References

External links
 Omega Chi Epsilon homepage (subpages also referenced)
 ACHS 

Association of College Honor Societies
Engineering honor societies
Chemical engineering organizations
Student organizations established in 1931
1932 establishments in Illinois